Manvel Arsenovich Gasratjan (also Gasratian) was a Russian historian, born in 1924 who died in 2007. He was a renowned Turkologist and Kurdologist at the Institute of Oriental Studies of the Russian Academy of Sciences (Institút  vostokovédenija Rossíjskoj akadémii naúk) in Moscow, where he established the Group of Kurdologists in 1979. According to WorldCat, he has written at least 8 academic books on Turkish and Kurdish history held in major U.S. libraries.

References

External links 
Biography

1924 births
20th-century Russian historians
Historians of Central Asia
2007 deaths
Soviet historians